Fransiskus Xaverius Basuki Abdullah (born Muhammad Basuki Abdullah, January 25, 1915 – November 5, 1993) was an Indonesian painter and a convert to Roman Catholicism from Islam. His work is characterized as realism and has been exhibited in the Indonesian National Gallery. He received formal training in The Hague. During the Japanese occupation of Indonesia he was an art teacher. After the war he became known internationally, winning an art contest on the occasion of the accession in the Netherlands of Queen Juliana. His status in Indonesia provided an opportunity to paint the official portrait of President Suharto. Abdullah was beaten to death by three assailants during a break-in at his Jakarta home.

See also
 Basoeki Abdullah Museum

References

External links
 Basuki Abdullah Museum website

1915 births
1993 deaths
Converts to Roman Catholicism from Islam
Indonesian Roman Catholics
Deaths by beating
Indonesian former Muslims
Indonesian murder victims
People from Surakarta
Realist artists
20th-century Indonesian painters